Nancy Henry may refer to:
Nancy A. Henry (born 1961), American poet
Nancy Henry (professor) (born 1965), American professor